Events and festivals in Macau.

February

Chinese New Year 
The Chinese in Macau celebrate the same religious festivals as their counterparts in Hong Kong and other regions in Asia.

March

Feast of the God Toutei 
Tou Tei is the Earth God and he is said to be everywhere. Celebrations are held at the Pou Tai Un Temple on Taipa.

Procession of the Passion of our Lord, The Good Jesus
This is where a statue of Christ is paraded through the streets to the Macau Cathedral.

April

Ching Ming or Qingming Festival
This Chinese tradition goes back thousand of years where on this day, families will visit the cemeteries to pay their respect and to sweep the graves of their ancestors. They will also burn joss sticks and paper objects, believing that the dead will receive these items "on the other side." Families will also present roast piglets, fruit and other food to the deceased but the food is not wasted for at the end of the day, there will be a family feast.

Easter Holidays

Anniversary of 1974 Portuguese Revolution
This day celebrates Portugal's left-wing military coup.

A-Ma Festival
A-Ma is a Taoist goddess and is particularly revered in Macau. Also known as Tin Hau, she is the deity of fisher folk and other seafarers. Legend told of the story where a junk, while sailing across the South China Sea, was caught in a tremendous storm and was about to sink. All aboard were terrified but at the last minute, a beautiful young woman stood up and ordered the elements to calm down. It did and the junk reached land safely. This mysterious woman is none other than the Goddess A-Ma. A temple was built on the spot where she landed and it is still there to this day, on the Inner Harbor. The name Macau came to be when many centuries later, when Portuguese soldiers asked for the name of the place, the locals replied "A-Ma-Gao" (Bay of A-Ma). It was eventually shortened to Macau. In recent times, a statue of A-Ma was erected on the highest point of Coloane Island. During the A-Ma Festival, offerings are made. There are also performances of Chinese opera.

May

Feast of Buddha 
The birthday of Prince Siddhartha, founder of Buddhism, is marked by devotees bathing his image. Born a prince, Siddhartha embarked on years of wandering to seek enlightenment. By resisting all temptations, he found that to attain true knowledge and peace, man had to renounce all of earthly desires and eliminate the self.

Feast of the Drunken Dragon
This is an unusual local festival that is observed by fish traders on the eighth day of the fourth moon. The festive occasion starts from Kwan Tai Temple (near Leal Senado square) where groups of intoxicated men will dance their way through markets and lanes while waving wooden dragons' heads and tails. The performance has also been interpreted as an exorcism or a fertility rite.

Tam Kong
Looked upon by fisherfolk, worshippers at the shrines of Taoist child god, Tam Kung, pray for health, wealth, knowledge and wisdom-and calm seas. It was said that during the Qing Dynasty, the orphan Tam Kung who was raised by his grandmother attained extraordinary power at the age of 12, thus making him the subject of worship. He could heal the sick and control the weather. Just by tossing a handful of peas into the air, he could bring rain. And to stop a fire, he would simply throw water into the air. During this festival, Chinese opera will be staged at Coloane village where there is a temple dedicated to Tam Kung.

Procession of Our Lady of Fatima
An annual procession of devotees from S. Domingos Church to the Penha Chapel where an open-air mass is said. The event commemorated the miracle of Fátima in Portugal in 1913.

June

Dragon Boat Festival
The Dragon Boat Festival is held on Nam Van Lakes. A spectacular competition, it commemorates a 3rd-century BC court adviser who drowned himself in protest against a decision by the emperor to go to war with a neighboring state. Wat Yuen was said to have left behind a beautiful poem before jumping into the river. In order to protect his body from being eaten by fishes, the people quickly launched their boats, splashed the water with paddles and tossed rice dumplings into the water.

Kuan Tai is one of the major figures of Chinese history, and legend describes him as a superhero, admired by many. Several temples in the territory are dedicated to this deity, one of the most important of which is situated at Rua dos Mercadores in the Historic Centre of Macau.

On the occasion of the Feast of Kuan Tai, lion dances are enacted and Chinese opera performed in a specially constructed bamboo shed outside the temple. Join the Feast of Kuan Tai in the alleyway near Senado Square: apart from discovering a slice of history in Kuan Tai Temple, you will undoubtedly be entranced by the temple itself.

Feast of Na Cha
The Feast of Na Cha is usually celebrated on the eighteenth day of the fifth lunar month. There are two parades arranged: one with worship ritual with incenses in the Na Cha Temple, another one is called “Prince Na Cha Parade”. Currently, the Na Cha Temple is a part of World Heritage Monuments in the Historic Centre of Macau.

August

Volleyball Grand Prix
Macau stages a section of the volleyball matches in the spacious Venetian stadium with international teams battling to qualify for the finals.

Feast of Maidens
Sometimes referred to as the Lovers' Festival, it falls on the seventh day of the seventh moon on the lunar calendar and has deep meaning for unmarried women. The festival celebrates the only day in the year when the legendary Heavenly Weaver can meet her lover, the Cowherd, over a bridge of birds spanning the Milky Way.

Feast of Hungry Ghosts
Appease the restless spirits by burning paper and food offering by the roadsides for it is said that during this month, the ghosts are freed from the underworld and is free to roam the world every year for a lunar month. This festival also feature local celebrations such as Chinese opera.

September

Mid-Autumn Festival 
This is one very important festival for the Chinese people and also one of the loveliest nights of the year. It was done in memory of a 14th-century uprising against the Mongols when rebels wrote the call to revolt on pieces of paper and embedded them in cakes, which was then smuggled to compatriots. Today, in commemoration of the festival, people eat special sweet cakes known as mooncake made of ground lotus and sesame. Children also get to play with colored lanterns and watch the huge autumn moon rise.

International Fireworks Festival
The International Fireworks Festival is normally held around the end of September to the beginning of October. It is a unique innovation with experts from different countries invited to compete with spectacles of fireworks.

October

Macau International Music Festival 
The Macau International Music Festival is a perfect blend of East and West-a prestigious event with international impact. One factor that makes this festival unique: the Macau International Music Festival is performed at unique locations.

Festival of Ancestors (Chung Yeung Festival)
During the Festival of Ascending Heights, or Double Ninth Festival, families offer prayers at the graves of their ancestors and climb hills in the belief that this will avoid disaster.

November

All Souls Day

Macau Grand Prix
The Macau Grand Prix is one of the biggest events in Macau's year. You'll get to see Formula 3 cars, motorcycles and saloon cars compete in this annual spectacle. The exciting event will take place at the tough Guia circuit.

December

Macau International Marathon and Macau International Half Marathon 
Running of the International Marathon over a full course that circles the peninsula and crosses to Taipa and Coloane Islands. Runners from overseas will join hundreds of Macau and Hong Kong athletes.

Feast of Immaculate Conception
It is a traditional Christian festival with special masses. A public holiday as well.

Winter Solstice
A traditional Chinese celebration, the Winter Solstice is a public holiday as well.

Christmas

Other festivals
Macau International Movie Festival (film)

See also
List of festivals in China
List of festivals in Asia

References 

 
and
Lists of festivals in China